An oppidum (plural oppida) is a large fortified Iron Age settlement or town. Oppida are primarily associated with the Celtic late La Tène culture, emerging during the 2nd and 1st centuries BC, spread across Europe, stretching from Britain and Iberia in the west to the edge of the Hungarian plain in the east. These settlements continued to be used until the Romans conquered Southern and Western Europe. Many subsequently became Roman-era towns and cities, whilst others were abandoned. In regions north of the rivers Danube and Rhine, such as most of Germania, where the populations remained independent from Rome, oppida continued to be used into the 1st century AD.

Definition

 is a Latin word meaning 'defended (fortified) administrative centre or town', originally used in reference to non-Roman towns as well as provincial towns under Roman control. The word is derived from the earlier Latin , 'enclosed space', possibly from the Proto-Indo-European , 'occupied space' or 'footprint'. In modern archaeological usage oppidum is a conventional term for large fortified settlements associated with the Celtic La Tène culture.

In his Commentarii de Bello Gallico, Julius Caesar described the larger Celtic Iron Age settlements he encountered in Gaul during the Gallic Wars in 58 to 52 BC as oppida. Although he did not explicitly define what features qualified a settlement to be called an oppidum, the main requirements emerge. They were important economic sites, places where goods were produced, stored and traded, and sometimes Roman merchants had settled and the Roman legions could obtain supplies. They were also political centres, the seat of authorities who made decisions that affected large numbers of people, such as the appointment of Vercingetorix as head of the Gallic revolt in 52 BC.

Caesar named 28 oppida. By 2011, only 21 of these had been positively identified by historians and archaeologists: either there was a traceable similarity between the Latin and the modern name of the locality (e.g. Civitas Aurelianorum-Orléans), or excavations had provided the necessary evidence (e.g. Alesia). Most of the places that Caesar called oppida were city-sized fortified settlements. However, Geneva, for example, was referred to as an oppidum, but no fortifications dating to this period have yet been discovered there. Caesar also refers to 20 oppida of the Bituriges and 12 of the Helvetii, twice the number of fortified settlements of these groups known today. That implies that Caesar likely counted some unfortified settlements as oppida. A similar ambiguity is in evidence in writing by the Roman historian Livy, who also used the word for both fortified and unfortified settlements.

In his work Geographia, Ptolemy listed the coordinates of many Celtic settlements. However, research has shown many of the localisations of Ptolemy to be erroneous, making the identification of any modern location with the names he listed highly uncertain and speculative. An exception to that is the oppidum of Brenodurum at Bern, which was confirmed by an archaeological discovery.

In particular, Dehn suggested defining an oppidum by four criteria: 
 Topography: Most oppida are situated on heights, but some are located on flat areas of land.
 Fortification: The settlement is surrounded by a (ideally uninterrupted) wall, usually consisting of three elements: a facade of stone, a wooden construction and an earthen rampart at the back. Gates are usually pincer gates.
 Chronology: The settlement dates from the late Iron Age: the last two centuries BC.

In current usage, most definitions of oppida emphasise the presence of fortifications, so they are different from undefended farms or settlements, and urban characteristics, marking them as separate from hill forts. They are often described as 'the first cities north of the Alps', though earlier examples of urbanism in temperate Europe are also known. The period of 2nd and 1st centuries BC places them in the period known as La Tène. A notional minimum size of  has often been suggested, but that is flexible and fortified sites as small as  have been described as oppida. However, the term is not always rigorously used, and it has been used to refer to any hill fort or circular rampart dating from the La Tène period. One of the effects of the inconsistency in definitions is that it is uncertain how many oppida were built.

In European archaeology, the term oppida is also used more widely to characterize any fortified prehistoric settlement. For example, significantly older hill-top structures like the one at Glauberg (6th or 5th century BC) have been called oppida.

Such wider use of the term is, for example, common in the Iberian archaeology; in the descriptions of the Castro culture it is commonly used to refer to the settlements going back to the 9th century BC. The Spanish word , also used in English, means 'a walled settlement' or 'hill fort', and this word is often used interchangeably with oppidum by archaeologists.

Location and type

According to pre-historian John Collis oppida extend as far east as the Hungarian plain where other settlement types take over. Around 200 oppida are known today. Central Spain has sites similar to oppida, but while they share features such as size and defensive ramparts the interior was arranged differently. Oppida feature a wide variety of internal structures, from continuous rows of dwellings (Bibracte) to more widely spaced individual estates (Manching). Some oppida had internal layouts resembling the insulae of Roman cities (Variscourt). Little is known, however, about the purpose of any public buildings.

The main features of the oppida are the walls and gates, the spacious layout, and usually a commanding view of the surrounding area. The major difference with earlier structures was their much larger size. Earlier hill forts were mostly just a few hectares in area, whilst oppida could encompass several dozen or even hundreds of hectares. They also played a role in displaying the power and wealth of the local inhabitants and as a line of demarcation between the town and the countryside. According to Jane McIntosh, the "impressive ramparts with elaborate gateways ... were probably as much for show and for controlling the movement of people and goods as for defense". Some of the oppida fortifications were built on an immense scale. Construction of the 7km-long  at Manching required an estimated 6,900 m³ of stones for the façade alone, up to 7.5 tons of iron nails, 90,000 m³ of earth and stones for the fill between the posts and 100,000m³ of earth for the ramp. In terms of labour, some 2,000 people would have been needed for 250 days. The 5.5km-long  of Bibracte may have required 40–60 ha of mature oak woodland to be clear-felled for its construction.

However, size and construction of oppida varied considerably. Typically oppida in Bohemia and Bavaria were much larger than those found in the north and west of France. Dry stone walls supported by a bank of earth, called Kelheim ramparts, were characteristic of oppida in central Europe. To the east, timbers were often used to support the earth and stone ramparts, called Pfostenschlitzmauer (post slot wall) or "Preist-type wall". In western Europe, especially Gaul, the murus gallicus (a timber frame nailed together, with a stone facade and earth/stone fill), was the dominant form of rampart construction. Dump ramparts, that is earth unsupported by timber, were common in Britain and were later adopted in France. They have been found in particular in the north-west and central regions of France and were combined with wide moats ("Type Fécamp"). Oppida can be divided into two broad groups, those around the Mediterranean coast and those further inland. The latter group were larger, more varied, and spaced further apart.

In Britain the oppidum of Camulodunon (modern Colchester, built between the 1st century BC and the 1st century AD), tribal capital of the Trinovantes and at times the Catuvellauni, made use of natural defences enhanced with earthworks to protect itself. The site was protected by two rivers on three of its sides, with the River Colne bounding the site to the north and east, and the Roman River forming the southern boundary; the extensive bank and ditch earthworks topped with palisades were constructed to close off the open western gap between these two river valleys. These earthworks are considered the most extensive of their kind in Britain, and together with the two rivers enclosed the high status farmsteads, burial grounds, religious sites, industrial areas, river port and coin mint of the Trinovantes.

History

Prehistoric Europe saw a growing population. According to Jane McIntosh, in about 5,000 BC during the Neolithic between 2 million and 5 million people lived in Europe; in the late (pre-Roman) Iron Age (2nd and 1st centuries BC) it had an estimated population of around 15 to 30 million. Outside Greece and Italy, which were more densely populated, the vast majority of settlements in the Iron Age were small, with perhaps no more than 50 inhabitants. While hill forts could accommodate up to 1,000 people, oppida in the late Iron Age could reach as large as 10,000 inhabitants.

Oppida originated in the 2nd and 1st centuries BC. Most were built on fresh sites, usually on an elevated position. Such a location would have allowed the settlement to dominate nearby trade routes and may also have been important as a symbol of control of the area. For instance at the oppidum of Ulaca in Spain the height of the ramparts is not uniform: those overlooking the valley are considerably higher than those facing towards the mountains in the area. Instead he believes the role of the ramparts as a status symbol may have been more important than their defensive qualities.

While some oppida grew from hill forts, by no means all of them had significant defensive functions. The development of oppida was a milestone in the urbanisation of the continent as they were among the first large settlements north of the Alps that could genuinely be described as towns or cities (earlier sites include the 'Princely Seats' of the Hallstatt period). Caesar pointed out that each tribe of Gaul would have several oppida but that they were not all of equal importance, implying a form of settlement hierarchy, with some oppida serving as regional capitals. This is also reflected in the archaeological evidence. According to Fichtl (2018), in the first century BC Gaul was divided into around sixty  (the term used by Caesar) or 'autonomous city-states', which were mostly organized around one or more oppida. In some cases, "one of these can be regarded effectively as a capital."

Oppida continued in use until the Romans began conquering Iron Age Europe. Even in the lands north of the River Danube that remained unconquered by the Romans, oppida were abandoned by the late 1st century AD. In conquered lands, the Romans used the infrastructure of the oppida to administer the empire, and many became full Roman towns. This often involved a change of location from the hilltop into the plain.

Examples
By modern country.

Belgium/Luxembourg/Netherlands
Oppidum Aduaticorum/Atuatucorum, location undetermined, Belgium
Canteleux, Huissignies, Chièvres, Wallonia, Belgium
Cheslé, Bérisménil, Samrée La Roche-en-Ardenne, Wallonia, Belgium
Chession, Han-sur-Lesse, Rochefort, Wallonia, Belgium
Flobecq, Wallonia, Belgium
Gilly-Ransart, Charleroi, Wallonia, Belgium
Gougnies, Gerpinnes, Wallonia, Belgium
Orchimont, Vresse-sur-Semois, Wallonia, Belgium
Sinsin, Somme-Leuze, Wallonia, Belgium
Titelberg, Luxembourg
Caestert, possibly Atuatuca Tungrorum, on the Walloon/Flemish/Dutch border, Belgium/Netherlands

Czech Republic

Hostýn
, Radíč
České Lhotice
Staré Hradisko Population estimate 5,000.
Stradonice
Třísov
Nevězice
, 170 ha. Population estimate 3,400. See reconstructed model of the acropolis in 450 BC.

France
Alesia
Oppidum d’Altimurium near Murviel-lès-Montpellier
Bibracte (Mont Beuvray), 135 ha
Bracquemont, Haute-Normandie
Cenabum, Orléans
La Chaussée-Tirancourt, Picardie
La Cheppe, Champagne-Ardenne
Corent
Divodurum, ancestor of present-day Metz, oppidum of the Mediomatrici

Oppidum d'Ensérune
Oppidum d'Entremont
Oppidum of Moulay
Oppidum de Nages
Oppidum de Marduel
Gergovia, 75 ha
Oppidum de Gondole
Jœuvres, Saint-Jean-Saint-Maurice-sur-Loire
Langres, Champagne-Ardenne
Montlaurès

Pech Maho
Salon-de-Provence
Toulouse
Uxellodunum
Vesontio, Besançon

Germany
Alcimoennis, Kelheim, 600 ha

Donnersberg, 240 ha
Dünsberg
, Creglingen
Heidengraben, 1,700 ha
Hohenasperg
Glauberg (controversial, not dating to the 1st/2nd century BC)
Manching, 380 ha
Martberg
Milseburg
Staffelberg, known as Menosgada
Oppidum Steinsburg

Great Britain
Calleva Atrebatum (Silchester), England
Camulodunon, (Colchester) England
Oram's Arbour (Winchester), England
Nanstallon, England
Ratae Corieltauvorum (Leicester), England
Traprain Law, Scotland
Verlamion, England
 Noviomagus Reginorum, (Chichester), England

Hungary
Budapest-Gellért Hill
Velem-Szentvid, Velem

Portugal
 Citânia de Briteiros
 Óbidos
 Castro Culture of Portugal

Serbia
Čarnok, near Vrbas
Židovar

Slovakia
Bratislava
Devín

Spain

 List of castros in Asturias
 List of castros in the Basque Country
 List of castros in Cantabria
 List of castros in Castile and León
 List of castros in Galicia
 Castro culture

Switzerland
Basel-Münsterhügel
Bern  (Brenodurum)
Mont Vully, Bas-Vully
Zürich-Lindenhof

See also
Gord (archaeology)

References
Notes

Bibliography

 Collis, John (2000), "'Celtic' Oppida", in Hansen, Mogens Herman, A Comparative Study of Thirty City-state Cultures, Det Kongelige Danske Videnskabernes Selskab, pp. 229–240, 
 Collis, John (2010), "Why do we still dig Iron Age ramparts?" (PDF), Collection Bibracte 19: 27–36, 
 Jones, Stephen (2001) Deconstructing the Celts: a skeptic's guide to the archaeology of the Auvergne. British Archaeological Reports. Oxford: Archaeopress. 
McIntosh, Jane (2009) Handbook of Life in Prehistoric Europe (paperback ed.). Oxford: Oxford University Press. 
 Woolf, Greg (July 1993), "Rethinking the Oppida", Oxford Journal of Archaeology 12: 223–234

Further reading

 Collis, John (1984), Oppida, earliest towns north of the Alps, Department of Prehistory and Archaeology, University of Sheffield, 
 Cunliffe, Barry & Rowley, Trevor (eds.) (1976) Oppida, the Beginnings of Urbanisation in Barbarian Europe: Papers Presented to a Conference at Oxford, October 1975. British Archaeological Reports. Oxford: Archaeopress.
 Garcia, Dominique (2004) La Celtique Méditeranée: habitats et sociétés en Languedoc et en Provence, VIIIe–IIe siècles av. J.–C. chapter 4 La « civilisation des oppida » : dynamique et chronologie. Paris, Editions Errance. 
 Sabatino Moscati, Otto Hermann Frey, Venceslas Kruta, Barry Raftery, Miklos Szabo (eds.) (1998) The Celts, Rizzoli

External links
Multi-lingual site on European oppida

 
Former populated places
Archaeological sites
Celtic archaeological sites
Iron Age Europe
La Tène culture